The Vertiente Artiguista is a social-democratic political party in Uruguay led by Enrique Rubio, who has been Senator of Uruguay since February 15th, 2000.

It is variously translated as Artiguist Tendency, Artiguist Slant, and Artiguist Source. The adjective Artiguist honors the 19th-century national hero José Artigas. The noun  means "slope" literally and can also mean "point of view" and "aspect".

Electoral history

Presidential elections 
Due to its membership in the Broad Front, the party has endorsed the candidates of other parties on several occasions. Presidential elections in Uruguay are held using a two-round system, the results of which are displayed below.

References

External links
Official web site

1989 establishments in Uruguay
Broad Front (Uruguay)
Political parties established in 1989
Political parties in Uruguay
Political party factions in Uruguay
Social democratic parties in Uruguay